Isotrichidae is a family of single-celled organisms (protozoa) in the order Vestibuliferida. Most species in this family are endosymbionts of ruminant animals. They are holotrichous, that is, their surface is covered in cilia of uniform length, and they contain several contractile vacuoles.

This family contains four genera:
 Dasytricha, Schuberg 1888
 Isotricha, Stein 1859
 Oligoisotricha, Imai 1981
 Protoiostricha, Kopperi 1937

References

Litostomatea